Ranger Rob is an animated children's television series created by Alexander Bar. The series debuted on Treehouse TV in Canada on September 5, 2016. It is produced by Nelvana in Canada, and Studio Liddell in the United Kingdom. In the US, it airs on Universal Kids and UniMás.

Plot
Ranger Rob is about a ranger named Rob, and his fellow friends Stomper and Dakota, who go on outdoor adventures in Big Sky Park.

Characters

Main
 Rob (voiced by Jonah Wineberg) is a ranger who loves to adventure. When he grows up he wants to be like his parents; a head ranger at BSP.
 Stomper (voiced by Darren Frost) is Rob's best friend. He is a yeti. Stomper Has 3 cousin yeti/Sasquatch’s in addition to a friend who is a larger creature Who looks like a tree with a big dog head named “Ogly-Pogly” he’s an ogre Of sorts.
 Dakota (voiced by Stephanie Anne Mills) is Rob's friend who always surprises him by swinging on a vine to drop by and say hello.

Recurring-Supporting
 Rob's mom (voiced by Helen King) 
 Rob's dad (voiced by Zachary Bennett) 
 Chipper (voiced by Robert Tinkler) is his car that has a lot of abilities.
 Sam (voiced by Justice James) is Rob's number one fan. He wants to be a ranger like Rob when he grows up.

Production
A second season of Ranger Rob was greenlit for 14 episodes on May 24, 2017. Released on July 12, 2018 (8 to 14). The show was renewed for a third season, consisting of 52 x 11-minute episodes, on February 10, 2020.

Episodes

Series overview

Season 1 (2016-17)

Season 2 (2018)

Season 3 (2020-21)
On February 10, 2020, the show was renewed for a third season, consisting of 52 x 11-minute episodes set to release in summer 2020.

Broadcast
Ranger Rob premiered on Treehouse TV in English Canada on September 5, 2016.

In the United States, the show debuted on Sprout on July 8, 2017. The series also airs on Super RTL in Germany, TF1 in France, TVNZ 2 in New Zealand, Minimax in Central Europe and premiered on Tiny Pop in the UK on March 17, 2018.

And it also premiered on NET. in Indonesia on May 1, 2019.

Ranger Rob debuted on Cartoon Network Asia's Cartoonito block on March 28, 2022. It also debuted on Boomerang Asia's Cartoonito block on May 2, 2022.

Home media
In 2018, Cinedigm signed a deal with Nelvana Enterprises to secure the North American DVD rights to Ranger Rob.

Awards and nominations

References

External links

Ranger Rob on Zap2it
 on Treehouse TV

Fictional park rangers
2018 British television series debuts
2021 British television series endings
2010s British animated television series
2010s British children's television series
2020s British animated television series
2020s British children's television series
2016 Canadian television series debuts
2021 Canadian television series endings
2010s Canadian animated television series
2010s Canadian children's television series
2020s Canadian animated television series
2020s Canadian children's television series
British children's animated adventure television series
Canadian computer-animated television series
Canadian preschool education television series
Animated preschool education television series
2010s preschool education television series
English-language television shows
Treehouse TV original programming
Television series by Nelvana